Raivo Põldaru (born 29 May 1951 in Põltsamaa, Jõgeva County) is an Estonian politician. He has been a member of the XIII Riigikogu.

In 1974, he graduated from University of Tartu in mathematics.

From 1999 to 2010 he was the director of Saduküla Basic School. From 2004 to 2006 he was the director of Puurmani Gymnasium.

From 2010 he is a member of Estonian Conservative People's Party.

References

Living people
1951 births
Conservative People's Party of Estonia politicians
University of Tartu alumni
Members of the Riigikogu, 2015–2019
People from Põltsamaa